The following article presents a summary of the 1991 football (soccer) season in Brazil, which was the 90th season of competitive football in the country.

Campeonato Brasileiro Série A

Semifinals

|}

Final

São Paulo declared as the Campeonato Brasileiro champions by aggregate score of 1-0.

Relegation
The two worst placed teams in the first stage, which are Grêmio and Vitória, were relegated to the following year's second level.

Campeonato Brasileiro Série B

Quarterfinals

|}

Semifinals

|}

Final

Paysandu declared as the Campeonato Brasileiro Série B champions by aggregate score of 2-1.

Promotion
The champion and runner-up, which are Paysandu and Guarani, were promoted to the following year's first level.

Copa do Brasil

The Copa do Brasil final was played between Criciúma and Grêmio.

Criciúma declared as the cup champions on the away goal rule by aggregate score of 1-1.

State championship champions

Youth competition champions

Other competition champions

Brazilian clubs in international competitions

Brazil national team
The following table lists all the games played by the Brazil national football team in official competitions and friendly matches during 1991.

Women's football

Brazil women's national football team
The following table lists all the games played by the Brazil women's national football team in official competitions and friendly matches during 1991.

The Brazil women's national football team competed in the following competitions in 1991:

References

 Brazilian competitions at RSSSF
 1991 Brazil national team matches at RSSSF
 1991 Brazil women's national team matches at RSSSF

 
Seasons in Brazilian football
Brazil